The 43rd Félix Awards were held on November 6, 2022 to honour achievements in Quebec music. The gala was hosted by Louis-José Houde, and televised by Ici Radio-Canada Télé. 

The advance ceremony announcing the winners in categories not selected for the main gala was hosted by Pierre Lapointe and broadcast by Télé-Québec on November 2.

Nominees and winners

References

Felix
Felix
Felix
Félix Awards